Flame in the Valley is a 1967 South Korean film directed by Kim Soo-yong. It was awarded Best Film at the Blue Dragon Film Awards ceremony.

Synopsis
In this melodrama, a man in a village in Jirisan hides a Communist soldier who has sneaked into the area. A widow, finding the soldier in the bamboo grove, visits him and carries on a sexual relationship with him. When she discovers she is pregnant, she commits suicide. When the villagers burn the woods to drive out remaining Communist guerillas, the man who has hidden the soldier perishes in an attempt to rescue him. The drama is based on a novel.

Cast
 Shin Young-kyun
 Ju Jeung-ryu
 Do Kum-bong
 Hwang Jung-seun
 Han Eun-jin
 Kim Jeong-ok
 Jeon Young-ju
 Kim Hyo-jin
 Kim Young-ok
 Ahn In-sook

Bibliography

English

Korean

Notes

External links 

1967 films
Best Picture Blue Dragon Film Award winners
1960s Korean-language films
South Korean drama films
Films directed by Kim Soo-yong